is a large, dominantly basaltic range of volcanoes on the east side of the Izu Peninsula which lies on the Pacific coast of the island of Honshu in Japan. The field covers a total area of 400 km2. The only recorded activity was a submarine phreatic eruption, between the city of Ito and Hatsushima island, that lasted for just 10 minutes in 1989. Ito, home to 74,000 people, is known for its hot springs.

Morphology 
The field covers the east side of the Izu Peninsula. It consists of several small stratovolcanoes (mostly Pleistocene in age) and overlapping pyroclastic cones, which covers 400 km2 in area. There are 70 young monogenetic volcanoes on land. Kawagodaira maar, which is about 3,000 years old, produced a large Holocene eruption that sent pyroclastic flows over a wide area.

Eruptions

1989 eruption
The only recorded eruption was an event on 13 July 1989. Two earthquakes, on 30 June and 9 July took, place on the Izu-Tobu Volcano. On 13 July, a seismometer recorded seismicity, a research vessel, the RV Takuyo reported hearing an explosion sound from the sea floor followed by a 30-second vibration at 18:33 pm. At 18:40 pm the crew reported that the sea domed up 500 m from the vessel, then a grey-black plume rose from the area, five more domes were reported in the next 5 minutes which caused the ship to vibrate. After that seismicity declined.

This marks the only known eruptive activity at Izu-Tobu. The next day a survey using an unmanned vessel discovered a new cone 100 metres underwater. The cone was around 450 Metres wide with a summit crater 200 m in diameter. The height of the cone above the sea floor was only 10 m in height.

The University of Tokyo monitors Izu-Tobu 24 hours a day.

Distinct cones

See Also
 List of volcanoes in Japan
 List of mountains in Japan

References 

 
 Volcanolive.com

External links 

 Izu-Tobu Volcanoes – Japan Meteorological Agency 
  – Japan Meteorological Agency
 Izu Tobu Volcano Group – Geological Survey of Japan
 Eruptive history of the Higashi Izu monogenetic volcano field – Shizuoka University

Active volcanoes
Fuji-Hakone-Izu National Park
Volcanoes of Shizuoka Prefecture
Mountain ranges of Shizuoka Prefecture
Monogenetic volcanic fields
Volcanoes of Honshū